Lars-Åke "Larsa" Nordström (born 23 July 1960, died 26 February 2009) was a Swedish curler and curling coach.

He participated on 2006 Winter Olympics as a coach of Swedish men's curling team.

In 1998 he was inducted into the Swedish Curling Hall of Fame.

Teams

Men's

Mixed

Record as a coach of national teams

References

External links
 

1960 births
2009 deaths
Swedish male curlers
Swedish curling champions
Swedish curling coaches
20th-century Swedish people